Sigurðarson or Sigurdarson may refer to:

Björn Bergmann Sigurðarson (born 1991), Icelandic international footballer
Dagur Sigurðarson (1937–1994), Icelandic poet, translator and visual artist
Guthormr Sigurðarson (1199–1204), King of Norway from January–August 1204, during the Norwegian civil war era
Hakon Sigurdarson (c. 937 – 995), de facto ruler of Norway from about 975 to 995
Haraldr III Sigurðarson (1015–1066), King of Norway from 1046 to 1066 as Harald III
Jakob Sigurðarson (born 1982), professional Icelandic basketball player
Jón Trausti Sigurðarson (born 1982), Icelandic marketing director
Sverrir Sigurðarson (1145–1202), King of Norway from 1177 to 1202

See also
Sigurðsson
Sigurdson

Icelandic-language surnames